Robin Smith (born 17 July 1943) is a retired British racing driver.

He competed in the British Formula One Championship in 1979 and 1980.

References

1943 births
Living people
British racing drivers
British Formula One drivers
British Formula One Championship drivers
24 Hours of Le Mans drivers
IMSA GT Championship drivers
World Sportscar Championship drivers
Place of birth missing (living people)